Vostok is a bandy club in Arsenyev, Russia. The club was founded in 1953, has earlier been playing in the Russian Bandy Super League, the top-tier of Russian bandy, and now plays in Russian Bandy Supreme League. The home games are played at Stadium Vostok. The club colours are red and blue.

References

Bandy clubs in Russia
Bandy clubs in the Soviet Union
Sport in Sverdlovsk Oblast
Bandy clubs established in 1953
1953 establishments in Russia